Borotra is a surname. Notable people with the surname include:

Didier Borotra (born 1937), French politician
Franck Borotra (born 1937), French politician, twin brother of Didier and nephew of Jean
Jean Borotra (1898–1994), French tennis player